Elizaville is an unincorporated community in Clinton Township, Boone County, in the U.S. state of Indiana.

History
A post office was established at Elizaville in 1855, and remained in operation until it was discontinued in 1907. The Elizaville Church was used for a scene in the 1986 film Hoosiers.

Geography

References

External links

Unincorporated communities in Boone County, Indiana
Unincorporated communities in Indiana